(recorded 1980 in Fredrikstad) is the debut album of the Norwegian new wave band The Aller Værste! from Bergen.

Review 
The record was released on the band's own label  in October 1980, and was awarded a Spellemannpris in 1980 in the class new wave (a category only awarded twice). The record sold in a number of approximately 5,000. In 1990 it was re-released on the Sonet Label (LP, CD and cassette); the LP version also included an additional 7" record, with tunes from the band's single and EP releases. In 2004 a new Sound Enhanced edition of the album was released on the Label Rec 90.  was also released on vinyl and CD on the label Oh Yeah! in 2010, this time with a fold-out cover showing what happens to the diving woman on the front cover. The CD edition includes the first single, EP and  recording as bonus tracks.

The title of the album alludes to the Alexander L. Kielland accident, which occurred earlier the same year.  (material fatigue) was the proposed explanation for the accident. The cover is a reproduction of the diving woman from the salt lozenge packages produced by Norwegian candy company Brynild. On the album cover, the diving woman is anonymized (in an intentionally ineffectual manner) with a censorship bar over her eyes, and the text is replaced by the band name and album title. The album, as well as also Sonet's later release, included an extensive booklet.

The record stands in retrospect as one of the foremost expressions of new wave in Norway. Musically, the album takes inspiration from many sources, but especially prominent is the inspiration from British ska and new wave. Funk aspects are also present, which at the time was not often played in Norway. The central position of the Farfisa organ on the record also gives it a unique sound. Lyrically, the album was one of the first innovative and poetic rock and roll albums in the Norwegian language at a time when Norwegian artists often sang in English. It covered issues from partying and drunkenness (""), to dark visions of the future ("Hong Kong", "Blank"), to social and political commentary ("", "", ""). In autumn 2011, newspaper Morgenbladet rated  number 6 among the 100 best Norwegian albums of all time.

Track listing 
 "" (3:15)
 "" (2:36)
 "" (2:01)
 "" (3:25)
 "" (2:23)
 "" (2:02)
 "" (3:36)
 "" (1:39)
 "" (3:17)
 "Hong Kong" (3:19)
 "" (3:09)
 "" (3:36)
 "" (3:21)
 "" (2:47)
 "" (2:28)
 "" (2:41)
 "Blank" (3:11)

Bonus tracks on the 2010 release 
 "" (4:08)
 "" (2:42)
 "" (2:48)
 "" (2:41)
 "" (3:31)
 "" (2:04)
 "" (live with Kringkastingsorkesteret conducted by Egil Monn Iversen, Spellemannprisen 1980)

Personnel

The Aller Værste!
 Chris Erichsen (no) – guitar, vocals
 Ketil Kern (no) – drums, backing vocals
 Sverre Knudsen (no) – bass guitar, organ, vocals
 Lasse Myrvold – guitar, vocals
 Harald Øhrn (no) – bass guitar, electronic organ, vocals

Additional musicians 
 Svein Johannesen (no) – trombone
 Øyvind Nord (no) – trumpet

Production 
Freddi Fiord (Sverre Knudsen (no)) – record producer
The Aller Værste! – co-producer
Kim Augestad - sound engineer
Svein Rønning – sound engineer

References

External links
Materialtretthet! on The Aller Værste! Official Website

Spellemannprisen winners
1980 debut albums